Tomás Aguilera  (born 15 November 1988) is a Mexican male volleyball player. He was part of the Mexico men's national volleyball team at the 2014 FIVB Volleyball Men's World Championship in Poland. He played for Chihuahua.

Clubs
 Chihuahua (2014)

References

1988 births
Living people
Mexican men's volleyball players
Olympic volleyball players of Mexico
Volleyball players at the 2016 Summer Olympics
2006 FIBA World Championship players
2002 FIBA World Championship players